Marc Gicquel was the defending champion but decided not to participate.
Julien Benneteau won the title, defeating Olivier Rochus in the final.

Seeds

Draw

Finals

Top half

Bottom half

References
 Main Draw
 Qualifying Draw

Open de Rennes - Singles
2011 Singles